"Any Emcee"  is the second single released from Nine's debut album, Nine Livez. It was released on March 28, 1995, and was produced by Rob Lewis. "Any Emcee" appeared on three different Billboard charts. The song sampled The Spinners' "I'll Be Around and Eric B. & Rakim's "My Melody".

Track listing

A-Side
"Any Emcee" (Radio Version)- 4:04  
"Any Emcee" (Instrumental)- 4:03  
"Any Emcee" (Acappella)- 3:32

B-Side
"Tha Cypha" (Radio Version)- 3:46  
"Tha Cypha" (Instrumental)- 3:48  
"Whutcha Want?" (Radio Remix)- 4:43

Charts

1995 singles
Nine (rapper) songs
1995 songs
Profile Records singles